The Men's automatic trap event at the 2010 South American Games was held on March 20 and March 21 at 9:00.

Individual

Medalists

Results

Team

Medalists

Results

References
Individual
Team

Automatic Trap M